The Association of the Scientific Medical Societies in Germany (AWMF; Arbeitsgemeinschaft der Wissenschaftlichen Medizinischen Fachgesellschaften), established in 1962 and located in Frankfurt am Main, is the umbrella organisation of more than 150 German medical societies.

It coordinates the national program of medical guidelines.

It is the German representative in the "Council for International Organizations of Medical Sciences CIOMS" at WHO.

The German Journal for Evidence and Quality in Healthcare ZEFQ is one of the organisation's official organs.

References

External links
AOfficial Website
German Medical Science (GMS) - "Open Access" Journal of AWMF

Medical and health organisations based in Hesse
Organizations established in 1962
1962 establishments in West Germany